Steven Mond (born May 12, 1971) is a Canadian former child actor best known for playing Robbie Jason on the sitcom Diff'rent Strokes.

Mond also guest starred on the TV series CHiPs and Quincy M.E. and had a role in the Steven Spielberg film, 1941 (1979).

He is currently a math teacher at Real Salt Lake City in Herriman, Utah. In May 2018, he competed on the Jeopardy!'' Teachers Tournament, where he made it to the finals and finished in third place, winning $25,000.

Filmography

References

External links

1971 births
American male child actors
American male television actors
Living people